The 1971 Cotton Bowl Classic was the 35th edition of the college football bowl game, played at the Cotton Bowl in Dallas, Texas, on Friday, January 1. A rematch from the previous year, the undefeated and top-ranked Texas Longhorns of the Southwest Conference were upset by the independent Notre Dame Fighting Irish, 24–11.

Teams

Notre Dame

Led by head coach Ara Parseghian, Notre Dame's captains were Larry DiNardo and Tim Kelly, and featured Joe Theismann at quarterback and Tom Gatewood as a wide receiver.

Texas

Texas was coached by Darrell Royal, and the captains for the Longhorns were Scott Henderson, Steve Worster, Bobby Wuensch and Bill Zapalac. The team also featured Jerry Sisemore at tackle and Jim Bertelsen at running back.

Texas was trying to win consecutive national championships, while Notre Dame was seeking revenge for the previous Cotton Bowl loss to Texas, its first bowl appearance in over four decades.

Game summary

After Texas' initial field goal, Notre Dame scored 21 straight points. Texas scored in the second quarter and Notre Dame added a field goal to lead 24–11 at halftime. Parseghian's defense held the Longhorn wishbone offense in check the rest of the game and the second half was scoreless. Texas committed six turnovers (five fumbles and an interception) while Notre Dame had only two turnovers.

Aftermath
It ended the Longhorns' 30-game winning streak, which is currently (as of October 2011) the 12th longest winning streak in NCAA Division I records.  Notre Dame had defeated Oklahoma in 1957 to end their 47-game win streak.

Second-ranked Ohio State lost to Stanford in the Rose Bowl, while #3 Nebraska won the Orange Bowl and was named the AP national champion for the 1970 season, with Notre Dame as runner-up.

Texas had been selected as the national champion by the UPI Coaches' Poll, whose final edition was then released at the end of the regular season, prior to bowl games.  After a similar occurrence in 1973, the Coaches Poll released its final edition after the bowl games, starting with the 1974 season.

References

External links
 1971 Cotton Bowl Highlights - Texas vs. Notre Dame via YouTube

Cotton Bowl Classic
Cotton Bowl Classic
Notre Dame Fighting Irish football bowl games
Texas Longhorns football bowl games
Cotton Bowl Classic
Cotton Bowl